Eden Park is a locality in Victoria, Australia,  north-east of Melbourne's Central Business District, located within the City of Whittlesea local government area. Eden Park recorded a population of 1,194 at the 2021 census.

History

Eden Park gets its name from an estate of the same name, which was sold by Ewen and Janet Robertson to an investor in 1888. Robertson originally acquired approximately 400ha in 1854 to build "Breadalbane", a twelve-roomed homestead. Much of the land is prone to erosion, which has limited development.

A primary school in Eden Park existed from 1904 to 1942. Eden Park Post Office opened on 7 October 1905, and closed in 1971.

Melbourne Polytechnic has a training centre in Eden Park called Northern Lodge, which operates as a thoroughbred stud and vineyard for students undertaking equine studies, and courses in viticulture and winemaking. During 2011, there were community protests to stop the Eden Park Kangaroo Cull on the property.

References

External links
Australian Places - Eden Park

Towns in Victoria (Australia)
City of Whittlesea